Gothos is a 1997 FMV video game developed by Mindmeld Multimedia and published by Microforum International.

Plot and gameplay 
Gothos is an interactive mystery adventure on three CDs.

The player is a vampire who is sent to investigate the unearthing of the ancient Scrolls of the First Blood.

Critical reception 
Tap Repeatedly thought the game was "abysmal and vapid", though recommended it as a hate-playing experience. Metzomagic didn't think it was a good game, but felt that it would appeal to "shock horror" fans.

References 

1997 video games
Full motion video based games
Classic Mac OS games
Video games developed in Canada
Windows games

Video games about vampires